Water polo is a water sport which has been contested at the Summer Deaflympics on 11 occasions. Water polo was recognised as a sporting event at the Deaflympics for the first time in 1949 with only two nations competing in the event. Water polo was contested only for men in the Deaflympic history and raised question marks regarding the availability of the sport at the Deaflympics.

The ICSD decided to remove water polo from the Summer Deaflympics due to lack of team preparations, decrease of teams, sponsorship issues and due to the dominance of Hungary in the sport. The sport event was last appeared in a Deaflympic competition in 2009.

Hungary is the most successful nation in the sporting event as it claimed 6 gold medals and 3 silver medals.

Reed Gershwind who is considered one of the most decorated Deaflympian has also competed in the water polo events representing United States in 1985, 1993 and 1997.

Medal winners

Medal table

See also 
 Water polo at the Summer Olympics

References 

Water polo at multi-sport events
Water polo
Discontinued sports at the Summer Deaflympics